"Don't Worry, Be Happy" is a song by Bobby McFerrin

Don't Worry, Be Happy may also refer to:

 Don't Worry, Be Happy (album), a 1988 compilation album by Bobby McFerrin
 Don't Worry Be Happy (Wanda Jackson album), a 1989 studio album by Wanda Jackson
 "Don't Worry Be Happy" (Guy Sebastian song), a song released in 2011
 Don't Worry Be Happy (play), a Marathi drama by Mihir Rajda
 "Don't worry, be happy", a famous quote by Meher Baba

See also
 Worry (disambiguation)
 No worries (disambiguation)